is a Japanese actress who is represented by the talent agency Sony Music Artists.

Filmography

TV series

Films

Theatrical animation

References

External links
  
 Official agency profile 

Japanese actresses
Japanese television personalities
Japanese gravure models
Asadora lead actors
1987 births
Living people
People from Kumamoto
Actors from Kumamoto Prefecture